Pineland is an unincorporated community in Jasper County, South Carolina, United States. Pineland has a post office with ZIP code 29934, which opened on May 10, 1901.

References

Unincorporated communities in Jasper County, South Carolina
Unincorporated communities in South Carolina